Gary Steven Waters (born August 15, 1951) is an American college basketball coach and the men's basketball former head coach at Cleveland State University.

Coaching career

Kent State
On April 3, 1996 Waters was named the 21st head coach at Kent State. On July 6, 2000 Waters signed a 6-year contract extension.

Rutgers
On April 6, 2001 Waters was named the 15th head coach at Rutgers. He previously coached at Rutgers University, guiding the Scarlet Knights to the NIT tournament final in 2004. Waters announced his resignation from Rutgers on March 1, 2006 and accepted a buyout from Rutgers worth about $550,000. He officially resigned after he coached his last game for Rutgers on March 16, 2006.

Cleveland State
Waters was named the 14th head basketball coach at Cleveland State University on April 6, 2006. On September 12, 2006 he signed his contract with a base salary of $225,000 a year. In 2008 Waters was named the Horizon League coach of the year. On October 27, 2008 Waters signed a 5-year rollover contract extension with Cleveland State with a base salary of $283,264 a year. On November 8, 2012 Waters signed a 7-year contract extension with Cleveland State with a base salary of $340,000. On March 7, 2017 Gary Waters announced his retirement from Cleveland State.

Personal life
Gary Steven Waters is a Detroit, Michigan native and a 1969 graduate of Mackenzie High School. Waters graduated with a B.S. in Business Administration from Ferris State in 1975, a  B.S. in Business Education from Ferris State in 1978 and an M.A. in Educational Administration from Central Michigan in 1976. Waters is also a member of the Ferris State University Hall of Fame. He is married to  Bernadette Amos, with two children Sean and Seena.

NBA players coached

Head coaching record

References

External links
 
 Cleveland State profile
 Ferris State Hall of Fame profile

1951 births
Living people
American men's basketball coaches
American men's basketball players
Basketball coaches from Michigan
Cleveland State Vikings men's basketball coaches
College men's basketball head coaches in the United States
Ferris State Bulldogs men's basketball coaches
Ferris State Bulldogs men's basketball players
Kent State Golden Flashes men's basketball coaches
Mackenzie High School (Michigan) alumni
People from Highland Park, Michigan
Rutgers Scarlet Knights men's basketball coaches
Sportspeople from Detroit